= U.S.–China Agreement on Cooperation in Science and Technology =

U.S.–China Agreement on Cooperation in Science and Technology 中美科技合作协定
- Signed: January 31, 1979
- Location: Washington, D.C., United States
- Expiry: August 27, 2029
- Original signatories: Jimmy Carter; Deng Xiaoping
- Parties: United States; China
- Languages: English; Chinese

The U.S.–China Agreement on Cooperation in Science and Technology (STA) (中美科技合作协定) is a landmark scientific cooperation agreement between the Government of the United States and the Government of the People's Republic of China, signed by Jimmy Carter and Deng Xiaoping on January 31, 1979. It was the first accord signed between the United States and China, in the same month as the formal establishment of bilateral diplomatic relations on January 1, 1979.

== History ==
The STA was signed by U.S. President Jimmy Carter and PRC leader Deng Xiaoping in January 1939.

The agreement was extended for the first time on January 19, 2011. It was amended and extended for five years in September 2018. On December 13, 2024, the governments of the two countries agreed to amend the original agreement and extend it for five years, effective August 27, 2024.
